The 1951 South Dakota State Jackrabbits football team was an American football team that represented South Dakota State University in the North Central Conference (NCC) during the 1951 college football season. In its fifth season under head coach Ralph Ginn, the team compiled a 8–1–1 record and outscored opponents by a total of 311 to 105.

Schedule

References

South Dakota State
South Dakota State Jackrabbits football seasons
South Dakota State Jackrabbits football